The 2022 Fordham Rams football team represented Fordham University  as a member of the Patriot League during the 2022 NCAA Division I FCS football season. They were led by fifth-year head coach Joe Conlin and played their home games at Coffey Field.

Previous season

The Rams finished the 2021 season with a record of 6–5, 4–2 Patriot League play to finish in third place.

Schedule

Game summaries

at Wagner

at Monmouth

Albany

at Ohio

Georgetown

at Lehigh

Stony Brook

at No. 5т Holy Cross

at Bucknell

Lafayette

Colgate

FCS Playoffs

at No. 15 New Hampshire – First Round

References

Fordham
Fordham Rams football seasons
Fordham Rams football
Fordham